Emmericia is a genus of very small freshwater snails which have an operculum,  aquatic gastropod mollusks in the family Amnicolidae, according to the taxonomy of the Gastropoda (Bouchet & Rocroi, 2005).

Emmericia is the type genus of the subfamily Emmericiinae.

Species
Species in the genus Emmericia include:
 Emmericia narentana Bourguignat, 1880
 Emmericia patula (Brumati, 1838) - type species

References

Further reading 
  Bourguignat J. R. 1880. Monographie du genre Emmericia. Angers : Lachèse et Dolbeau.

Amnicolidae
Taxa named by Spiridon Brusina